Kölesd is a village in Tolna county, Hungary.

Populated places in Tolna County